Chandrabose or Chandra Bose may refer to:

 Chandrabose (lyricist), Indian lyricist who writes songs for Tollywood films
 Chandrabose (composer), Indian composer who writes songs for Kollywood films
 Chandrabose Suthaharan, Sri Lankan Tamil editor of the Tamil magazine Nilam
 Subhas Chandra Bose, Indian nationalist and Axis collaborator during World War II
 Sarat Chandra Bose, barrister, elder brother and supporter of Subhash Chandra Bose
 Jagadish Chandra Bose, Bengali polymath: a physicist, biologist, botanist, archaeologist, and writer of science fiction
 Raj Chandra Bose, Indian mathematician and statistician best known for his work in design theory and the theory of error-correcting codes
N.S.Chandra Bose, former President of the Indian Medical Association and former President of the Tamil Nadu State Bharatiya Janata Party

Places
 Netaji Subhash Chandra Bose International Airport, an airport located in Dum Dum, near Kolkata, West Bengal, India
 Netaji Subash Chandra Bose Road, an important thoroughfare in South Kolkata, which connects the localities of Tollygunge and Garia

Films

 Netaji Subhas Chandra Bose: The Forgotten Hero, a 2005 Indian English-language film directed by Shyam Benegal
 Subash Chandra Bose (film), a 2005 Indian Telugu-language film directed by K. Raghavendra